Curtis–Champa Streets Historic District is located in Denver, Colorado. It was added to the National Register of Historic Places in 1975 and is bounded by Arapahoe, 30th, California, and 24th Sts. covering 870 acres and 356 buildings. In 1983 the boundaries were expanded to roughly 30th, Stout, Downing and Arapahoe Sts., covering
870 acres and 77 buildings.

See also
 National Register of Historic Places listings in downtown Denver, Colorado
 Auraria 9th Street Historic District

References

Buildings and structures completed in 1870
Neighborhoods in Denver
Historic districts on the National Register of Historic Places in Colorado
National Register of Historic Places in Denver